Paulo Maló is a Portuguese dentist and businessman.

Early life and career 
Paulo Maló was born in Portuguese Angola (an overseas territory of Portugal until 1975) and moved to mainland Portugal in the 1960s in order to study dental medicine in Lisbon.  He received his graduate degree at the Faculty of Dental Medicine from the University of Lisbon in 1989.  In 1993, together with his medical and clinical research team, he began the development of the All-on-4 technique.  Implemented in 1998, this innovative approach is recognised by the medical community as one of the most significant advances in the field of Implant Dentistry.  In 1995, he founded the Malo Clinic in Portugal.  Success in the years that followed led to exponential growth, giving rise to one of the most international healthcare groups today: Malo Clinic Health & Wellness, a healthcare and wellness business with presence in Portugal, Colombia, China, Israel, and United States.

Throughout his career, he has also received several distinctions and awards for his medical breakthroughs as well as management, leadership and entrepreneurial skills.  His healthcare and wellness business have been widely reported in Portuguese and international media.

References

External links
Maló Clinic official website

Portuguese dentists
Portuguese businesspeople
University of Lisbon alumni
Living people
Year of birth missing (living people)

ja:All-on-4
pt:All-on-4